George Henry Hugh Cholmondeley, 4th Marquess of Cholmondeley  (3 July 1858 – 16 March 1923) was a British peer and a hereditary joint Lord Great Chamberlain of England. He exercised the office of Lord Great Chamberlain during the reign of King Edward VII (1901–1910).

Biography
Cholmondeley was a direct descendant of Sir Robert Walpole, the first Prime Minister of Great Britain.

He was born at Kirtlington Park, Oxfordshire, the eldest son of George Cholmondeley, and Susan Caroline Dashwood.

As his father died prior to his grandfather, Cholmondeley succeeded to his grandfather's land, estates and title upon his death in 1884. He was styled Marquess of Cholmondeley and Earl of Rockford in the peerage of the United Kingdom; Earl Cholmondeley, Viscount Malpas and Baron Cholmondeley in the peerage of England, Baron Newburgh in the peerage of Great Britain, and Viscount Cholmondeley and Baron Newborough in the peerage of Ireland.

He was a Lieutenant in the service of the Cheshire Yeomanry.  Later, he held the office of Deputy Lieutenant of Norfolk.

Lands and estates

The family seats are Houghton Hall, Norfolk, and Cholmondeley Castle, which is surrounded by a  estate near Malpas, Cheshire.

The Cholmondeleys bought Wenbans near Wadhurst in Sussex in the mid-1890s. After major restoration work in the 1920s and 1930s, the rustic farm only  from London was reported to have been used as a romantic getaway by the Prince of Wales (later Edward VIII).

Position at court
One moiety part of the ancient office of Lord Great Chamberlain is a Cholmondeley inheritance. This hereditary honour came into the Cholmondeley family through the marriage of the first Marquess of Cholmondeley to Lady Georgiana Charlotte Bertie, daughter of Peregrine Bertie, 3rd Duke of Ancaster and Kesteven. The second, fourth, fifth, sixth and seventh holders of the marquessate have all held this office, which changes between the heirs of the two daughters of the Duke with each new reign.

The 4th Marquess of Cholmondeley was appointed to the office in September 1901, after the succession of King Edward VII earlier that year. He held the office until the King died and was succeeded by his son King George V in 1910.
Cholmondeley was invested as a Privy Counsellor on 24 July 1901.

Family
Cholmondeley married Winifred Ida Kingscote on 16 July 1879 at St George's, Hanover Square in Hanover Square, London. Cholmondeley's bride was the daughter of Colonel Sir Robert Nigel Fitzhardinge Kingscote and Lady Emily Marie Curzon, and the granddaughter of Richard Curzon-Howe, 1st Earl Howe.

The children of that marriage were:
 Lady Lettice Joan Cholmondeley (23 May 1882 – 2 November 1946)
 Sir George Horatio Charles Cholmondeley (19 May 1883 – 16 September 1968)
 Lt. Col. Lord George Hugo Cholmondeley   (17 October 1887 – 26 August 1958)

Death
On 20 February 1923, Cholmondeley was thrown from his horse while riding at Cholmondeley Castle. The horse tripped over a tree root and rolled over its rider. He had suffered a broken thigh and other injuries but seemed to be making progress. He died unexpectedly three weeks later at 64; his death was attributed to heart failure. It was his fourth serious accident in 15 years. In an obituary, The Times wrote that the marquess "was first and foremost a sportsman... despite his experience and mastery of horsemanship, he was a very unlucky rider."

His son, George Horatio, succeeded him as Marquess of Cholmondeley.

Further reading
 1886 – Descriptive particulars with views and plans of the "Houghton" Estate, Norfolk : a princely domain, containing in its entirety about 17,000 acres London: Dryden Press.

Notes

References
 Debrett, John, Charles Kidd, David Williamson. (1990).  Debrett's Peerage and Baronetage. New York: Macmillan. ,

External links

 Houghton Hall
  Cholmondeley Castle
  Funeral procession of Marquis, c. 1925

1858 births
1923 deaths
Deputy Lieutenants of Norfolk
Members of the Privy Council of the United Kingdom
Lord Great Chamberlains
Cheshire Yeomanry officers
George
4
People from Houghton, Norfolk